The Walk is a 1953 Italian comedy-drama film directed by Renato Rascel and starring Rascel, Valentina Cortese and Paolo Stoppa. It is very loosely based on Nikolai Gogol's short story Nevsky Prospekt. It grossed 148 million lire at the Italian box office.

Plot 

A timid schoolteacher attempts to fall in love with a prostitute. In the process he loses his position. He finds that she is hard to convince.

Cast  
 Renato Rascel as  Paolo Barbato 
 Valentina Cortese as  Lisa 
 Paolo Stoppa as  Headmaster of the College
 Peppino De Martino as  Luigi Magri 
 Francesco Mulé as  Teacher
 Anna Maria Bottini as Lisa's Friend
  Lia Angeleri as Teacher  
 Tino Bianchi  as Teacher
 Ignazio Leone as Teacher
 Enzo Maggio
 Lina Marengo

References

External links

Italian comedy-drama films
1953 comedy-drama films
1953 directorial debut films
1953 films
Films based on works by Nikolai Gogol
1950s Italian films